Hammonds Plains is a community within the urban area of Municipality of Halifax, in Nova Scotia, Canada.

History
Hammonds Plains was established as a settlement area for United Empire Loyalists in 1786 along a road running from Birch Cove on Bedford Basin to St. Margaret's Bay. Landowners voted to name the road after the popular outgoing Lt. Governor Andrew Snape Hamond. Further settlers arrived with disbanded soldiers from the Napoleonic Wars and Black Refugees from the War of 1812. The settlement was also the eastern end of the Old Annapolis Road intended to create a settled corridor and transportation link between Halifax and Annapolis Royal. While the Annapolis Road never developed, settlement opened up the a modest amount of viable farmland and more significantly developed many saw mills.

During the 1950s, Hammonds Plains was a potential location for a new international airport for Halifax, where the airport would've been constructed between the present day Glen Arbour Subdivision and Lucasville. The airport was ultimately built in Goffs, just south of Enfield, Nova Scotia.

Geography

The Government of Nova Scotia defines Hammonds Plains as adjacent to Bedford-and-Lucasville to the east; Upper Sackville-and-Middle Sackville to the north; Stillwater Lake, Timberlea, and Upper Tantallon to the south; and Upper Hammonds Plains to the west. The community is situated along the isthmus of the Chebucto Peninsula with its centre located along Highway 213 (Hammonds Plains Road).

The Hammonds Plains region is rich in small lakes and is a dormitory area for Halifax. Many homes lie on large unserviced lots, except in the Kingswood subdivision where 90% of the units have municipal water service and along the Hammonds Plains Road itself where there are several small businesses involved in automobile repair, waste management, physiotherapy clinics, and other maintenance activities. The population grew rapidly in the 1990s, particularly in subdivisions at the western end of the Hammonds Plains Road. Halifax's water comes from Pockwock Lake which lies north of Hammonds Plains.

As of 2021, Hammonds Plains Road—the urban area (population centre) of Hammonds Plains—had a landmass of 318 hectares (3.18 km2).

Residential Subdivisions
Blue Mountain Estates
Cedarwood
Glen Arbour
Highland Park
Kingswood
Kingswood North
Maplewood
Perry Pond
Uplands Park
Voyageur Lakes
White Hills

Activities

 Glen Arbour Golf Course, an 18-hole private championship golf course that hosts many tournaments, including the 2005 LPGA Canadian Women’s Open and the Telus World Skins Game in 2012.
 Hatfield Farm, a venue that contains a petting zoo and horseback riding, and is a popular spot for weddings and other functions
 Atlantic Splash Adventure, a water park containing 9 slides and several flat rides

An annual cycling event called Close To Home: The Tour of Hammonds Plains links the earliest settled areas with the new subdivisions.

Demographics
Hammonds Plains is a well-established community—however—the demographic information available from Statistics Canada pertains to the urban area (retired population centre) of Hammonds Plains Road, not the community of Hammonds Plains.

Hammonds Plains Road had a population density of 572 people per km2.

Transportation
Halifax Transit serves Hammonds Plains with Route 433 (Tantallon). This route travels from Tantallon, passes-through Hammonds Plains, and arrives at the Lacewood Terminal in Clayton Park. If the transit-user wants to travel to a community within the urban area, the transit-user can use the Lacewood Terminal to connect to other transit routes.

Halifax Transit Routes
Route 433 (Tantallon)

Education
Schools which service residents of Hammonds Plains include:

Services Blue Mountain Estates, Kingswood, and Kingswood North

Charles P. Allen High School (Bedford)
Kingswood Elementary School
Madeline Symonds Middle School

Services Cedarwood, Glen Arbour, Highland Park, Maplewood, and White Hills

 Charles P. Allen High School (Bedford)
 Hammonds Plains Consolidated School
 Madeline Symonds Middle School

Waterstone is serviced schools in Middle Sackville: Sackville Heights Elementary/Junior High, Millwood High School

Notable residents
 Andrew Bodnarchuk
 Bruce Guthro
 Brad Marchand

References

Explore HRM

External links
Close To Home: The Tour of Hammonds Plains

Black Canadian settlements
Communities in Halifax, Nova Scotia
General Service Areas in Nova Scotia